A point of presence (PoP) is an artificial demarcation point or network interface point between communicating entities. A common example is an ISP point of presence, the local access point that allows users to connect to the Internet with their Internet service provider (ISP). A PoP typically houses servers, routers, network switches, multiplexers, and other network interface equipment, and is typically located in a data center. ISPs typically have multiple PoPs. PoPs are often located at Internet exchange points and colocation centres.

In the US, this term became important during the court-ordered breakup of the Bell Telephone system.  A point of presence was a location where a long-distance carrier (IXC) could terminate services and provide connections into a local telephone network (LATA).

See also 
 Content delivery network
 Web cache
 Meet-me room

References 

Telecommunications infrastructure